Most of Nusrat Fateh Ali Khan's early music was recorded with Rehmat Gramophone House later turned RGH Label. Throughout the ’70s and early ’80s Nusrat Fateh Ali Khan released hundreds of cassettes, most of them containing one or two lengthy songs. Chris Nickson, of Global Rhythm, argues that trying to make order of Khan's entire discography would be a nightmare.

Nusrat Fateh recorded hundreds of albums around the globe. OSA, Birmingham released about 125 audio albums and 30-35 concert films. His international labels included Real World Records, Virgin Music, Ocora, World Music Network, Shanachie, Nascente, American Records, EMI Arabia & France. He recorded 40-50 cassettes in Pakistan, many of which are available under the EMI Label. More than two decades after his death, music companies around the world are releasing new albums every year.

Albums

OSA Releases

 Vol 1, Best of Shahenshah
 Vol 2, Tumhain Dillagi Bhool
 Vol 3, Je Toon Rab Noon Manana
 Vol 4, Wadah Kar Ke Sahjjan
 Gorakh Dhanda - Vol 05
 Yadon ke Sayeay - Vol 06
 Jani Door Gaye - Vol 07
House of Shah - Vol 08
Dam Dam Ali Ali - Vol 9
Jhoole Laal - Vol 10
Marhaba Marhaba - Vol 11
Magic Touch - Vol 12
Shabads - Vol 13
Mast Qalander - Vol 14 
Maikadah - Vol 15
Bari Bari - Vol 16
Nit Khair Mangan - Vol 17
Mae Ni Mae - Vol 18
Sham Savere - Vol 19
Naat - Vol 20
Bulle Shah - Vol 21
Aansoo - Vol 22
Mighty Khan - Vol 23
Dhol Mahia - Vol 24
Allah Hoo - Vol 25

Chithhi - Vol 26
Kali Kali Zulfon - Vol 27
Sanson Ki Mala - Vol 28
Saqi Mere Saqi - Vol 29
Vird Karo Allah Allah - Vol 30
Akhian - Vol 31
Beh Ja Mahi - Vol 32
Neendran - Vol 33
Sanam - Vol 34
Mere Man Ka Raja - Vol 35
Piya Ghar Aaya - Vol 36
Washington University - Vol 37
Mast Nazron Se - Vol 38
House of Shah 2 - Vol 39
Kande Utte Mehrman Way - Vol 40
Yadan - Vol 41
 Jana Jogi De Naal - Vol 42
 Ali Maula - Vol 43
 Tere Main Ishq Nachaian 
 Charkha Naulakha - Vol 45
 Kehde Ghar Jawan - Vol 46
 House Of Shah 3 - Vol 47
Jewel - Vol 48
Mighty Khan 2 - Vol 49
Must Mast 2 - Vol 50

Bandit Queen - Vol 51
Prem Deewani - Vol 52
Kalam-e-Iqbal - Vol 53
Ya Hayyo Ya Qayyum - Vol 54
Chan Sajna - Vol 55
Loay Loay Aaja Mahi - Vol 56
Wohi Khuda Hai - Vol 57
Pilao Saqi - Vol 58
Samandar Maen Samandar - Vol 59
Ishq - Vol 60
Piala - Vol 61
Kulli Yar Dee - Vol 62
Gali Wichoon Kaun Langia - Vol  63
Sufi Qawwalies - Vol 64
Pyar Karte Hain - Vol 65
Sorrows - Vol 69

Major international releases
 1988. In Concert in Paris, VolNitin Sawhney, Musician, 17 June 2004, Observer.co.uk 1. Ocora.
 1988. Shahen-Shah. RealWorld/CEMA.
 1990. Mustt Mustt. RealWorld/CEMA. Collaboration with Michael Brook.
 1991. Magic Touch OSA.
 1991. Shahbaaz. RealWorld/CEMA.
 1991. The Day, The Night, The Dawn, The Dusk. Shanachie Records.
 1992. Devotional Songs. Real World Records.
 1992. Love Songs. EMI.
 1993. Ilham. Audiorec.
 1993. Traditional Sufi Qawwalis: Live in London, Vol. 2. Navras Records.
 1994. Pakistan: Vocal Art of the Sufis, Vol 2 – Qawwali. JVC.
 1994. Nusrat Fateh Ali Khan & Party. Real World Records.
 1994. The Last Prophet. Real World Records.
 1994. Traditional Sufi Qawwalis: Live in London, Vol. 4. Navras Records.
 1995. Revelation. Interra/Intersound.
 1995. Back to Qawwali. Long Distance
 1996. In Concert in Paris, Vol. 3–5. Ocora.
 1996. Qawwali: The Art of the Sufis. JVC
 1996. Night Song. Real World Records.
 1996. Dead Man Walking: The Score. Columbia/Sony
 1996. Intoxicated Spirit. Shanachie Records.
 1996. Mega Star. Interra.
 1996. Bandit Queen. Milan.
 1996. The Prophet Speaks. M.I.L. Multimedia.
 1996. Sangam. EMI.
 1997. Live In India. RPG.
 1997. Akhian. M.I.L. Multimedia.
 1997. Live in New York City. M.I.L. Multimedia.
 1997. Farewell Song: Alwadah. M.I.L. Multimedia.
 1997. In Concert in Paris, Vol 2. Ocora.
 1997. Oriente/Occidente: Gregorian Chant & Qawwali Music. Materiali Sonori.
 1997. Dust to Gold, Realworld Recordings.
 1998. Allah & The Prophet. Ex Works.
 1998. Star Rise: Remixes. EMI.
 1998. Live at Royal Albert Hall. M.I.L. Multimedia.
 1998. Missives from Allah. BCD.
 1998. Imprint: In Concert. Hi Horse Records. (Selections from the 23 January 1993 concert at Meany Hall, University of Washington in Seattle, during Khan's residency at their Ethnomusicology program.)
 1999. Peace. Omni Parc.
 1999. Live at Islamabad, Vol 1–2. M.I.L. Multimedia.
 1999. Passion. NYC Music.
 1999. Visions of Allah. Ex Works.
 1999. Swan Song. Narada.
 2000. Jewel. MoviePlay.
 2000. Live in London, Vol 3. Navras Records.
 2001. Opus. Vanstory.
 2001. The Final Studio Recordings. Legacy/Sony.
 2001. Pukaar: The Echo. Navras Records.
 2001. The Final Moment. Birdman Records.
 2002. Body and Soul. RealWorld/CEMA.
 2002. Sufi Qawwalis. Arc Music.
 2004. Allah Hoo. Saregama.
 2004. Aur Pyar Ho Gaya. Saregama.
 2004. Ishq Da Rutba. Saregama.
 2004. Kartoos. Saregama.
 2004. Main Aur Meri Awargi. Saregama.
 2004. Ye Jo Halka. Saregama.
 2005. Nami Danam. JVC Compact Discs.
 2010. Mitter Pyare Nu. Nupur Audio

Album features
Passion (1989)  with Peter Gabriel
Only One (1997)  with Mahmood Khan
Vande Mataram (1997)  with A. R. Rahman

Film soundtracks
Bollywood soundtracks
Bandit Queen (1994)
Aur Pyaar Ho Gaya (1997)
Kartoos (1999)
Kachche Dhaage (1999)
Dillagi (1999)
Dhadkan (2000)

Western soundtracks
 Last Temptation of Christ (1988)
Dead Man Walking (1996)
Bend It Like Beckham (2002)

Singles
Sohna Mukhra Vol. 82 - OSA
Saqi Mere Saqi Vol. 29 - OSA
Jana Jogi De Nal Vol 42. - OSA
Jewel Vol 48. - OSA
Masoom Vol. 66 - OSA 
Tauba - Hi-Tech Music
Mere Rashke Qamar - Hi-Tech Music
Mere Rashke Qamar (Complete Original Version) - Hi-Tech Music
Mere Rashke Qamar (Duet Version ft. Naseebo Lal) - Hi-Tech Music
Mere Rashke Qamar (ft. Rahat Fateh Ali Khan) - Hi-Tech Music
Mere Rashke Qamar (Remix) - Hi-Tech Music
Shikwa/Jawab-e-Shikwa Vol.72 - OSA
Rehmat Ka Jhoomer Vol. 108 - OSA
Haq Ali Ali Vol. 126 - OSA
Sochta Hoon - Hi-Tech Music
Dard-e-Gham - Venus Worldwide Entertainment
Main Khuda Ki Sanaa Gaon Ga - MRC 
Mast Mast (Massive Attack Remix) - Real World Records/Virgin
Dama Dum Mast - OSA

Films

Documentaries
Nusrat Fateh Ali Khan: le dernier prophète (1996). Directed by Jérôme de Missolz.
Nusrat has Left the Building... But When? (1997). Directed by Farjad Nabi. (This 20-minute docudrama focuses on Khan's early career.)
A Voice from Heaven (1999). Directed by Giuseppe Asaro. New York, NY: Winstar TV & Video. (This 75-minute documentary, available on VHS and DVD, provides an introduction to Khan's life and work.)
Samandar Main Samandar (2007). A documentary aired on Geo TV detailing Khan's career.
The King of Qawalli (2009). A short film aired on Dawn News about Khan's life and career.

Concert films
The JVC Video Anthology of World Music and Dance (1990). Video 14 (of 30) (South Asia IV). Produced by Ichikawa Katsumori; directed by Nakagawa Kunikiko and Ichihashi Yuji; in collaboration with the National Museum of Ethnology, Osaka. [Tokyo]: JVC, Victor Company of Japan; Cambridge, Massachusetts: distributed by Rounder Records. Features a studio performance by Khan and Party (two Urdu-language songs: a Hamd, and a Manqabat for Khwaja Mu'inuddin Chishti. Filmed in Tokyo, Japan, 20 September 1987, for Asian Traditional Performing Arts).
Nusrat! Live at Meany (1998). Produced by the University of Washington. 87-minute recording of a concert of 23 January 1993 at Meany Hall, University of Washington in Seattle, during Khan's residency at the ethnomusicology program there.
Live in Concert in the UK, (DVD, vols. 1–17) [OSA]; recorded between 1983 and 1993
Akhiyan Udeek Diyan (DVD) [Nupur Audio]
Je Tun Rab Nu Manauna (DVD) [Nupur Audio]
Yaadan Vicchre Sajan Diyan Aayiyan (DVD) [Nupur Audio]
Rang-e-Nusrat (DVD, vols. 1–11) [Music Today]; recorded between 1983 and 1993 (same material as the OSA DVDs)
 VHS videotapes, vols. 1–21 [OSA]; recorded between 1983 and 1993 (same material as the OSA DVDs)
Luxor Cinema Birmingham (VHS vol. 1, 1979)
Digbeth Birmingham (VHS vol. 2, 1983)
St. Francis Hall Birmingham (VHS vol. 3, 1983)
Royal Oak Birmingham (VHS vol. 4, 1983)
Private Mehfil (Wallace Lawley Centre, Lozells Birmingham, November 1983) (VHS vol. 5)
Private Mehfil (VHS vol. 6, 1983)
Natraj Cinema Leicester (VHS vol. 7, 1983)
Live in Southall (VHS vol. 8)
Live in Bradford (VHS vol. 9, 1983)
Live in Birmingham (VHS vol. 10, 1985)
Allah Ditta Hall (VHS vol. 11, 1985)
Harrow Leisure Centre (VHS vol. 12)
University of Aston (VHS vol. 13, 1988)
Aston University (VHS vol. 14, 1988)
WOMAD Festival Bracknell (VHS vol. 15, 1988)
Live in Paris (VHS vol. 16, 1988)
Poplar Civic Centre London (VHS vol. 17)
Imperial Hotel Birmingham (VHS vol. 18, 1985)
Slough Gurdawara (SHABADS) (VHS vol. 19)
Imran Khan Cancer Appeal (VHS vol. 20)
Town Hall Birmingham (VHS vol. 21, 1993)

Sales

The following are known sales of records with songs credited to Nusrat Fateh Ali Khan, either as a vocalist, composer, or special thanks.

The following are known Indian sales of Bollywood soundtrack albums featuring copied versions of songs originally composed by Nusrat Fateh Ali Khan, without crediting him.

See also
Rahat Fateh Ali Khan discography

References

External links
Nusrat Fateh Ali Khan's Detailed Discography at NusratOnline.com
Nusrat Fateh Ali Khan's Discography at AllMusic

Discographies of Pakistani artists
Discography